Arthur Edmon Brown Jr. (born November 21, 1929) is a retired four-star general of the United States Army who served as Vice Chief of Staff (VCSA) from 1987 to 1989.

Military career
Brown was born on November 21, 1929, in Manila, Philippines, the son of an Army dental surgeon. After graduating from high school, he attended the University of Alabama for two years before being accepted to West Point. He graduated from the United States Military Academy in 1953 and was commissioned in the infantry, and also married the former Jerry Cook immediately upon graduation.

After graduating from Airborne and Ranger School, he was assigned as a rifle platoon leader with the 508th Airborne Regimental Combat Team. He was a company commander in the 60th Infantry Regiment, He went to Vietnam with the Military Advisory Assistance Group-Vietnam from 1962 to 1963, receiving the Combat Infantryman Badge, Bronze Star, and an Army Commendation Medal with "V" device.

Upon returning to the U.S. he attended the University of Pittsburgh and earned a master's degree in public and international affairs in 1964, and then was assigned to the Directorate of Plans, Army Combat Development Command, and awarded a Legion of Merit for his work on the Assessment of Combat Effectiveness Study and the Dynamics of Firepower and Maneuver Study, as well as for his efforts as a member of the Pacification Role in Vietnam Study Group and his work with the Institute of Land Combat. He served as executive officer to the U.S. Representative, NATO Military Committee in Belgium, from 1967 to 1968, earning a Joint Service Commendation Medal.

He graduated from the Army War College and returned to Vietnam in 1969 for a second tour, commanding the 1st Battalion, 52nd Infantry Regiment of the Americal Division and serving as an advisor to the 9th Infantry Division, Army of the Republic of Vietnam. While commanding the battalion he was awarded the Silver Star, the Bronze Star Medal with "V" device, the Legion of Merit, the Distinguished Flying Cross, and the Air Medal.

After his second Vietnam tour he returned to the Army War College as Director, Arms Control and Disarmament Studies, and later served as Director, General Purpose Forces Strategy Studies. His work there earned him a third Legion of Merit. He went on to command the 1st Brigade, 1st Infantry Division, and worked as a division chief and executive officer in the Office of the Deputy Chief of Staff for Operations from 1975 to 1978, receiving a fourth Legion of Merit.

Brown next served as Assistant Division Commander, 25th Infantry Division from 1978 to 1980. He returned to West Point as Deputy Superintendent, and his tenure there also had him responsible for the welcome, housing, and transition of the American hostages that had been released from Iran, for which he received a Meritorious Service Medal. In 1981, he took command of Mobilization and Readiness Region IV, which was responsible for Reserve and National Guard units in five southeastern states, Puerto Rico, and the Virgin Islands.

As a Lieutenant General in 1983, he was assigned as Director of the Army Staff, and oversaw  the greatest modernization program since World War II. This included the transition to the M1 Abrams, the M2/M3 Bradley Fighting Vehicle, UH-60 Blackhawk, AH-64 Apache, and the creation or transition to four light infantry divisions: the 6th, 7th, 10th and 25th Infantry Divisions. He also managed the staff reorganization mandated by the Goldwater-Nichols Department of Defense Reorganization Act of 1986 and served as a member of the Stilwell Commission on security. He was also responsible for providing guidance on public affairs matters during a time which saw the Gander aircraft disaster and Operation Urgent Fury. For his work as the Director of the Army Staff, he was awarded the Distinguished Service Medal.

In June 1987, he was appointed to the post of Vice Chief of Staff of the Army. He served as Chief of the U.S. Delegation to the 1987 American, British, Canadian, and Australian Conference on Military Standardization and provided analyses and advice on the Intermediate-range Nuclear Force Arms Control Treaty. He retired in 1989, and was awarded both the Defense Distinguished Service Medal and Army Distinguished Service Medal.

Awards and decorations

Post military career
After retiring from the military, he served in various community service positions, including serving on the board of the United Way of Beaufort County, South Carolina, serving as a trustee of the Technical College of the Lowcountry Foundation and later as chairman, and serving on the board of the Hilton Head Island Foundation. He was the 2002 Distinguished Graduate Award recipient from the Association of Graduates, the United States Military Academy alumni association.

Notes

In 2010 General Brown was awarded the Distinguished Alumnus Award by the University of Pittsburgh's Graduate School of Public and International Affairs.

References
Association of Graduates bio 

1929 births
Living people
People from Manila
United States Military Academy alumni
United States Army personnel of the Vietnam War
University of Pittsburgh alumni
Recipients of the Distinguished Flying Cross (United States)
Recipients of the Silver Star
Recipients of the Air Medal
United States Army War College alumni
Recipients of the Legion of Merit
United States Army generals
Recipients of the Distinguished Service Medal (US Army)
United States Army Vice Chiefs of Staff
Recipients of the Defense Distinguished Service Medal